Gadag Junction railway station (station code: GDG) is a railway station under South Western Railway in Gadag district, Karnataka. It serves Gadag-Betageri. The station consists of 3 platforms. The station lies on Guntakal–Vasco da Gama section HDN-7A | and as well as it connects Gadag–Hotgi railway line.The Gadag–Hotgi railway line was converted from metre gauge to broad gauge in December 2008. Amenities at Gadag railway station include: computerized reservation office, waiting room, retiring room, free Wi-Fi facility, vegetarian and non-vegetarian refreshments, and book stall. It is a "B" Category ISO 14001 2015 for Environmental Management System certified station on 10.02.2020.

History 
In 1881 the Bombay Eastern Deccan Railway was under construction with William Michell the Engineer-in-Charge. This line immediately upon opening became the Bijapur branch of the Southern Mahratta Railway.

The Southern Mahratta Railway (SMR) was founded in 1882 to construct a metre gauge (MG) railway between Hotgi and Gadag (opened to traffic in 1884), one of the "famine lines" set up with a guarantee. In the same year (1882), it was contracted by the Indian State of Mysore to work the several metre-gauge lines that the Mysore State had built or was in the course of construction.

In 1888, a line was extended from Londa towards the Portuguese colony of Goa where it connected with the Marmagao line at Castle Rock. (From 1902 this line was leased as the West of India Portuguese Railway). By 1890, this line extended from Londa eastwards via Guntakal to Bezwada, and northwards to Poona, turning the SMR from an assortment of branches to a real railway network.
In 1908, the SMR merged with the Madras Railway (MR) to form the Madras and Southern Mahratta Railway(M&SMR)

New lines

Proposed new line between Gadag Junction and Yalvigi 
In August 2017, Ministry of Railways had sanctioned 56 km of rail line between Gadag Junction and Yalvigi.

Proposed new line between Gadag Junction and Wadi Junction 
In the year 2013–14, Ministry of Railways had sanctioned 252 km of rail line between Gadag Junction and

RET survey for New line (Updating) between Gadag Junction to Harapanahalli (93 km) 
Physical survey completed and report is under preparation

Reconnaissance engineering cum traffic survey between Gadag Junction and Krishna (216 km) 
Survey for conducting reconnaissance engineering cum traffic survey for new line between Gadag to Krishnar via Kotumachagi, Naregal, Gajendragarh, Hanumapur, Ilkal and Lingasugur (216 km).

Rail line doubling & electrification works

Proposed doubling & rail electrification for Gadag Junction to Hotgi section
Gadag–Hotgi Rail Doubling is sanctioned in the year 2014–15 Doubling for part length of this project, i.e. from Hotgi–Kudgi (134 km) is taken up under Customer Funding Model. For this purpose NTPC have deposited Rs.946 cr. with Railway.
New crossing station @ Kudgi with 4 lines for giving connectivity to NTPC was commissioned on 29.01.2017.
doubling Work is Completed in the section between Hotgi jn-Wandal station  Tenders valued @ Rs 14 crores have been called for redevelopment of the station. Gadag–Hotgi section is also sanctioned for electrification and tenders are floated for the same.

M/s Kalpataru PowerTransmission Ltd, Gandhinagar has been awarded for electrification of Hotgi to Gadag.

Proposed doubling & rail electrification for Hospet Junction to Vasco da Gama section 
Gadag Junction will be complete double electric line station as Hospet–Vasco Da Gama rail line getting doubled & electrified in phases. Hospet–Hubli–Londa–Vasco-da-Gama DL (352.58 km) sanctioned in the year 2010–11. This project is being executed by RVNL. So far 67 km. has been commissioned. Further 36 km is targeted for commissioning in 2017–18.
Hospet–Tinai Ghat rail electrification tender is floated.

Major trains 
Trains those run through/from Gadag Junction are:
 Howrah–Vasco da Gama Amaravati Express
 Gol Gumbaz Express
 Haripriya Express
 Hampi Express
 Hubballi–Secunderabad Express
 Hubballi–Varanasi Weekly Express
 Amaravati Express
 Yesvantpur–Barmer AC Express
 Yesvantpur–Bikaner Express
 Mumbai CSMT–Gadag Express*
 Solapur–Hubballi Intercity Express
 Tirupati–Vasco da Gama Express
 Hyderabad–Vasco da Gama Express
 Kacheguda–Hubballi Prasanti Nilayam Triweekly Express
 Manuguru–CSMT Kolhapur Express
 Mysore–Sainagar Shirdi Express
 Kacheguda–Vasco da Gama Quarterly Express
 Ajmer–Bangalore City Garib Nawaz Express
 Bhagat Ki Kothi−Bangalore City Express (via Guntakal)
 Tirupati/Hyderabad–Vasco da Gama Weekly Express
 Solapur–Gadag DEMU Passenger
 Vijayapur-Yeshwanthpur Special
 Solapur–Dharwad Passenger
 Vijayapura–Hubballi Passenger
 Ballari–Dharwad Passenger
 Tirupati–Hubballi Fast Passenger
 Hubballi–Vijayawada Passenger
 Chikkabenakal–Hubli Fast Passenger

References 

Railway junction stations in Karnataka
Hubli railway division
Railway stations in Gadag district